Kehtna is a small borough in Rapla County, in central Estonia, located about  southeast of the town of Rapla. Other nearby settlements include Keava, Kaerepere and Lelle. Kehtna is the administrative centre of Kehtna Parish. It has a population of 1,674 (as of 1 January 2012).

Kehtna Manor was first mentioned in 1470 as Kectel and in 1485 as Hof Kechtenal. The Early-Classicist main building was built in the 1790s. After a fire in 1905, it was rebuilt in 1906–10 and gained its current Baroque look. The manor is surrounded by a  large park with a varied collection of shrubs.

Notable people
Alo Bärengrub (born 1984), football player
Alo Dupikov (born 1985), football player
Rummu Jüri (1856–?), outlaw and folk hero, worked as a valet in Kehtna Manor
Külliki Saldre (born 1952), actress

Gallery

References

External links

Kehtna Parish 
Kehtna Manor
Kehtna Manor at Estonian Manors Portal

Boroughs and small boroughs in Estonia
Manor houses in Estonia
Kreis Harrien